Saskatoon was a federal electoral district in Saskatchewan, Canada, that was represented in the House of Commons of Canada from 1908 to 1935 and from 1949 to 1968.

This riding was created in 1907 from parts of Assiniboia West, Humboldt and Saskatchewan ridings.

It was abolished in 1933 when it was redistributed into Rosthern and Saskatoon City ridings.

It was recreated in 1947 from parts of Rosthern and Saskatoon City ridings, and abolished in 1966 when it was redistributed into Moose Jaw, Saskatoon—Biggar and Saskatoon—Humboldt  ridings.

Election results

See also 

 List of Canadian federal electoral districts
 Past Canadian electoral districts

External links 

Former federal electoral districts of Saskatchewan